Keith Francis (1955–2011) was an American middle-distance track athlete, US Government professional and Boston College Trustee.

Early life, education and athletic achievements 
Francis was born in New Bedford, Massachusetts in 1955. A natural athlete, Francis participated in baseball and basketball at New Bedford High School (1968–1972). He played basketball through his senior year, but decided to concentrate on track beginning his Junior year because he knew that his family could not afford sending him to College, and he felt he could be good enough to get a scholarship. Soon, he was dominating the 880 yard run (Now the 800 meter).  As a Senior he won the Massachusetts Class A Eastern Mass, Massachusetts State and the New England Championships at that distance. He broke the state record that year at 1:52.5.

Accepted into Boston College on a track scholarship, he dominated middle-distance races during his tenure. Upon his graduation he was a seven-time All-American and NCAA Champion with eight school records, five of which he still held at the time of his death in 2011 (800 meter outdoor and indoor, 4 X 800 meter relay and sprint medley relay, and the 1,000 meter).

Outside of the NCAA, he was invited to compete in the 1974 and 1975 US National Track and Field Championships and the 1975 Pan American Games in Mexico City. His National and World rankings gave him the opportunity to participate in many international meets during that time.  After his senior year at BC, Francis was invited to the 1976 Olympic trials for the 800M. He progressed through the preliminary heats and made it to the final, finishing 8th.

ESPN's Track & Field analyst Larry Rawson declared Keith Francis Track Career as "the greatest Boston College has ever seen" He is on the "BC All-Time Greatest Athletes" list.  

School Records

Career after Boston College and death 
After Graduating in 1976 with a BA from the Boston College Lynch School of Education, Francis went on to earn a master's degree at Boston University.

He returned to New Bedford as a Guidance counsellor for a short time and then relocated to Maryland, where he remained for 30 years, first as a probation officer at the Superior Court in DC, and then a long career working for the US Government, retiring as a Senior Intelligence Analyst at the Bureau of Alcohol, Tobacco and Firearms.

After retirement he returned to New Bedford.  In 2009 he was invited to join the Board of Trustees at Boston College, and served from 2010 to 2011.

Francis died of cancer on July 27, 2011, in his home town of New Bedford, at the age of 56.

Legacy 

In 2008 Francis co-organized "Reconnect" at Boston College, the first AHANA (African, Hispanic/Latino, Asian and Native American alumni) reunion.  He remained active in the organization until his death.

He was a member of the Boston College Board of Trustees 2010–2011.

The Keith Francis Memorial Scholarship was established in 2013. Multiple scholarships are awarded to local college-bound graduates from New Bedford who embody "Community service, Education and Achievement".

Awards and honors 
 1972: Southeastern Massachusetts District Board of Basketball Officials,  "Large school Most Valuable Player"
 1972: Massachusetts State Champion and New England Champion 880 Yd
 1974–1976: NCAA All-American (seven times), NCAA National Champion, 1000M (1975)
 1981: Hall of Fame Inductee, BC Varsity Club Athletic Hall of Fame
 2007: Hall of Fame Inductee, Massachusetts State Coaches Association 
 2013: New Bedford Track at the Andrea McCoy Recreation center was renamed "Keith Francis Memorial Track"

References

Year of birth missing (living people)
American male middle-distance runners
Athletes (track and field) at the 1975 Pan American Games
Pan American Games track and field athletes for the United States